June Haverly is the second self-released EP by Australian singer Troye Sivan. It was released in June 2012.

The title June Haverly is reference to the month in which he was born (June) and his mother's maiden name (Haverly).

Track listing

References

2012 EPs
Troye Sivan EPs